Pseudophilautus samarakoon, the Samarakoon's shrub frog, is a species of frogs in the family Rhacophoridae, endemic to Sri Lanka. Wickramasinghe et al. suggest that, following the IUCN Red List criteria, it should be considered "critically endangered" because the extent of occurrence is <100 km2, it is recorded from a single location, and its habitat is under severe threat.

Its natural habitats are wet lowland forests of Sri Lanka. It is threatened by habitat loss. It is one of the 8 species of rhacophorids that was discovered from Adam's Peak recently.

Etymology
The frog was named after Mr. Ananda Vijith Samarakoon, a leading Sri Lankan wildlife conservationist.

References

samarakoon
Endemic fauna of Sri Lanka
Frogs of Sri Lanka
Amphibians described in 2013